Additional Protocol to the Convention on Cybercrime, concerning the criminalisation of acts of a racist and xenophobic nature committed through computer systems is an additional protocol to the Council of Europe Convention on Cybercrime. This additional protocol was the subject of negotiations in late 2001 and early 2002. Final text of this protocol was adopted by the Council of Europe Committee of Ministers on 7 November 2002 under the title "Additional Protocol to the Convention on cybercrime, concerning the criminalisation of acts of a racist and xenophobic nature committed through computer systems, ("Protocol"). The Protocol opened on 28 January 2003 and entry into force is 1 March 2006. As of July 2017, 29 States have ratified the Protocol and a further 13 have signed the Protocol but have not yet followed with ratification.

The Protocol requires participating States to criminalize the dissemination of racist and xenophobic material through computer systems, as well as of racist and xenophobic-motivated threats and insults. Article 6, Section 1 of the Protocol specifically covers the denial of the Holocaust and other genocides recognized as such by other international courts set up since 1945 by relevant international legal instruments. Section 2 of Article 6 allows a Party to the Protocol at their discretion only to prosecute if the offense is committed with the intent to incite hatred, discrimination or violence; or to make use of a reservation, by allowing a Party not to apply – in whole or in part – Article 6.

The Council of Europe Explanatory Report of the Protocol states the "European Court of Human Rights has made it clear that the denial or revision of 'clearly established historical facts – such as the Holocaust – ... would be removed from the protection of Article 10 by Article 17' of the ECHR (see in this context the Lehideux and Isorni judgment of 23 September 1998)".

Two of the English speaking states in Europe, Ireland and the United Kingdom, have not signed the additional protocol, (the third, Malta, signed on 28 January 2003, but has not yet ratified it). On 8 July 2005 Canada became the first non-European state to sign the convention. The United States government does not believe that the final version of the Protocol is consistent with the United States' constitutional guarantees and has informed the Council of Europe that the United States will not become a Party to the protocol.

References

Cybercrime
Computer law treaties
International criminal law treaties
Laws criminalizing Holocaust denial
Anti-racism in Europe
Xenophobia
Council of Europe treaties
Treaties concluded in 2003
Treaties entered into force in 2006
Treaties of Albania
Treaties of Armenia
Treaties of Bosnia and Herzegovina
Treaties of Croatia
Treaties of Cyprus
Treaties of the Czech Republic
Treaties of Denmark
Treaties of Finland
Treaties of France
Treaties of Germany
Treaties of Greece
Treaties of Latvia
Treaties of Lithuania
Treaties of North Macedonia
Treaties of Monaco
Treaties of Montenegro
Treaties of the Netherlands
Treaties of Norway
Treaties of Portugal
Treaties of Romania
Treaties of Senegal 
Treaties of Serbia
Treaties of Slovenia
Treaties of Spain
Treaties of Ukraine
2003 in France